was a city in Toyama Prefecture, Japan. The city was founded on 15 March 1951 and dissolved in November 2005.

Demographics
As of 2003, the city had an estimated population of 37,094 and the population density of 1,146.29 persons per km². The total area is 32.36 km².

History
On November 1, 2005, Shinminato, along with the towns of Daimon, Kosugi and Ōshima, and the village of Shimo (all from Imizu District), was merged to create the city of Imizu, and no longer exists as an independent municipality.

Places of interest
This city was famous for such places as Shinminato-Bridge, Kaiwo-maru Park, Shinminato Fishery, Classical Float Parade in October, and the Uchikawa River.

Education
 Shinminato High School
 Toyama National College of Technology Imizu Campus

Dissolved municipalities of Toyama Prefecture
Imizu, Toyama